The 1973 Cal State Hayward Pioneers football team represented California State University, Hayward—now known as California State University, East Bay—as a member of the Far Western Conference (FWC) during the 1973 NCAA Division II football season. Led by third-year head coach Bob Rodrigo, Cal State Hayward compiled an overall record of 3–7 with a mark of 3–2 in conference play, tying for third third in the FWC. The team was outscored by its opponents 263 to 162 for the season. The Pioneers played home games at Pioneer Stadium in Hayward, California.

Schedule

References

Cal State Hayward
Cal State Hayward Pioneers football seasons
Cal State Hayward Pioneers football